Brian Edward Harrison (born May 19, 1982) is an American government official who served as chief of staff of the United States Department of Health and Human Services (HHS). He ran for the United States House of Representatives in the 2021 special election for Texas's 6th congressional district, gaining 10.8% of the vote and placing fourth in a field of 23 candidates. He won the special election race for the Texas House of Representatives District 10 on September 28, 2021.

Education 
Harrison earned a Bachelor of Arts degree in economics from Texas A&M University.

Career 
From 2005 to 2009, Harrison held positions at the Department of Health and Human Services, Social Security Administration, United States Department of Defense, and Office of the Vice President of the United States during the Presidency of George W. Bush.

After leaving government service in 2009, he was the director of healthcare practice at the DCI Group, a public affairs consulting group. In 2011, he was a delegate at the annual American-German Young Leaders Conference organized by the American Council on Germany. Harrison then worked at his father's homebuilding business, Harrison Homes. From 2012 to 2018 he owned and operated a Dallas, Texas, dog-breeding business called Dallas Labradoodles.

During the Presidency of Donald Trump, Harrison was appointed deputy chief of staff in the Department of Health and Human Services (HHS) and promoted to chief of staff when his predecessor departed in June 2019. Harrison coordinated the HHS early response to the COVID-19 pandemic before those responsibilities were transferred to Robert Kadlec in February 2020.

In February 2021, Harrison was reported to be exploring running for the special election in  after the death of incumbent Ron Wright. On March 1, 2021, Harrison officially declared his candidacy. Harrison came in fourth place in the special election with 10.81% of the vote.

Two months later on August 9, 2021, Harrison announced his candidacy for the Texas House of Representatives District 10 special election to replace Jake Ellzey, who vacated the district seat after winning the Texas's 6th congressional district special election, the one Brian ran for back in May. The special election was held on August 31, 2021, and Harrison placed first with 41 percent of the vote with 4,613 votes and John Wray placed second with 36 percent of the vote with 4,031 votes.  Harrison and Wray would later face each other in a runoff election. The runoff was held on September 28, 2021, and Harrison defeated Wray 55.38% to 44.62%.

Harrison supports a ban on Democrats being given committee chairmanships as long as the Republicans hold the majority of seats in the Texas House.

Electoral history

Results

Personal life 
Harrison was married to Tara Napier in 2011. She worked at the White House during the Bush administration in 2007 and at the Office of the Secretary of Defense from 2005 to 2011 before being hired by BP as communications manager in December 2011. She became head of corporate affairs in 2019. Harrison and Napier have four children. Harrison's father, Ed Harrison, ran for U.S. Congress in Texas's 24th congressional district in 1994 and 1996 against Democrat Martin Frost and for state Senate against Republican Kip Averitt in 2002, losing all three.

See also
 Alex Azar

References

Living people
United States Department of Health and Human Services officials
Members of the Texas House of Representatives
Dog breeders
George W. Bush administration personnel
Texas A&M University alumni
Trump administration personnel
Candidates in the 2021 United States elections
1982 births